Route 275 is a -long local highway in northeast New Brunswick, Canada.

Communities along Route 275
 Glencoe
 Val-Melanson
 Saint-Arthur
 McKendrick
 Maltais
 Blair Athol
 Upper Balmoral
 Balmoral
 Selwood
 Eel River Crossing
 Darlington

See also
List of New Brunswick provincial highways

References

New Brunswick provincial highways
Roads in Restigouche County, New Brunswick